Standesamt Zachasberg was a civil registration district (Standesamt) located in Kreis Kolmar, province of Posen of the German Empire (1871-1918) and administered the communities of:

Kol = Kolmar; Mar = Margonin; Sam = Samotschin; Zac = Zachasberg

External links 

This article is part of the project Wikipedia:WikiProject Prussian Standesamter. Please refer to the project page, before making changes.

Civil registration offices in the Province of Posen